Mana Music is a  music supervision company  based in Australia and New Zealand.

Screen composers

David Bridie, Dale Cornelius, Peter Dasent, Elizabeth Drake, Joel Haines, Mick Harvey, Philip Judd, Johnny Klimek & Reinhold Heil,  David Long, Don McGlashan, Plan 9, Richard Pleasance and David Thrussell.

Music supervision

Films
Perfect Strangers
Whale Rider
Muriel's Wedding
Rikky and Pete
No. 2
Death in Brunswick
Love the Beast
The Tree
My Year Without Sex
Mary and Max
Boys are Back
Boy
Griff the Invisible

TV
Good Guys Bad Guys
Street Legal
Outrageous Fortune
City Homicide
Talkin' 'Bout Your Generation
Satisfaction
Four Weddings
Bondi Rescue
Recruits
My Life Is Murder

External links
Mana Music

Music publishing companies of Australia